Gardner House is a historic home located at Palmyra, Marion County, Missouri.  It was built about, and is a two-story, "L" plan, Federal style painted brick dwelling, with Greek Revival style detailing. It is six bays wide and has a side-gable roof.  It once housed a tavern located on a north–south stage coach route between St. Louis, Missouri and east Iowan towns.

It was added to the National Register of Historic Places in 1971.

References

Houses on the National Register of Historic Places in Missouri
Greek Revival houses in Missouri
Federal architecture in Missouri
Houses completed in 1828
Buildings and structures in Marion County, Missouri
National Register of Historic Places in Marion County, Missouri